Dr. Parashuram Gangwar was an Indian politician, and ex member of parliament, a doctor by profession.  He was born in a small town of Barkhera. His father, Jhamman Lal, was a local former.  In May 1957, he married Ishwarwati and has two sons and four daughters with her.

He qualified A.M.B.S. from Lalit Hari Ayurvedic College, Pilibhit, Uttar Pradesh, he was a Medical Practitioner and agriculturist.  He served as a member of parliament for tenth Lok Sabha from Pilibhit constituency in 1991 and received 30.86% votes and defeated Menaka Gandhi of Janata Dal.

References

External links
 tenth Lok Sabha: Members Bioprofile Members Biodata.

1937 births
2015 deaths
Bharatiya Janata Party politicians from Uttar Pradesh
Activists from Uttar Pradesh
People from Pilibhit
Lok Sabha members from Uttar Pradesh
India MPs 1991–1996